Nahla Hussain al-Shaly (b. 1971/1972 – December 18, 2008) was a promoter of women's rights in Iraqi Kurdistan, and the leader of the Kurdistan Women's League, the women's wing of the Kurdistan Communist Party. On December 18, 2008, she was shot and decapitated after gunmen stormed her home in Kirkuk. Hussain, a married mother of two, was 37 at the time.

References

Year of birth missing
2008 deaths
2008 murders in Iraq
Iraqi feminists
Iraqi women's rights activists
Iraqi Kurdish women
Iraqi murder victims
People murdered in Iraq
1970s births
Deaths by firearm in Iraq
Communist Party of Kurdistan – Iraq
Iraqi communists
Violence against women in Iraq